Carlo Duse (5 January 1898 – 9 September 1956) was an Italian film actor. He appeared in more than 80 films between 1916 and 1956. He was born in Udine, Italy and died in Rome, Italy.

Selected filmography

 Uragano (1918)
 Il mistero della casa n. 30 (1920)
 Romola (1924) - Bargello (uncredited)
 Gli ultimi giorni di Pompei (1926) - Burbo
 Cento di questi giorni (1933) - Vito's Duel Assistant
 Villafranca (1934)
 The Blind Woman of Sorrento (1934) - Emisario borbonico
 Teresa Confalonieri (1934)
 The Last of the Bergeracs (1934)
 Aurora sul mare (1934)
 Le scarpe al sole (1935) - Tenente degli Alpini
 I Love You Only (1935) - Policeman
 The Joker King (1936) - Captain Ciro Romoa
 Music in the Square (1936)
 Tredici uomini e un cannone (1936) - Uomo #3
 Campo di maggio (1936) - Marchand
 Ginevra degli Almieri (1936)
 Condottieri (1937) - Minor Role (uncredited)
 Scipione l'africano (1937) - Messo di Magone
 The Ferocious Saladin (1937) - Movie director
 Il conte di Brechard (1938)
 Il torrente (1938) - Il parroco
 Under the Southern Cross (1938) - Donati
 Giuseppe Verdi (1938) - Temistocle Solera
 Pride (1938)
 Lotte nell'ombra (1938) - Blanchard
 Ettore Fieramosca (1938) - Jacopo, lo scudiero spia di Graiano
 Piccoli naufraghi (1939) - Il controbbandiere
 Montevergine (1939) - Pietro Verdesi
 Traversata nera (1939)
 Backstage (1939) - (uncredited)
 An Adventure of Salvator Rosa (1939) - Il capitano della guardia
 Il segreto di Villa Paradiso (1940) - Rosenberg
 Arditi civili (1940)
 Fanfulla da Lodi (1940) - Torvaspada
 Incanto di mezzanotte (1940)
 The Siege of the Alcazar (1940) - Il maggiore Ratto
 The Cavalier from Kruja (1940) - Argiropulos
 Abandonment (1940) - Richard
 La fanciulla di Portici (1940) - Il capitano don Diego Callegas
 Eternal Melodies (1940) - Il conte Arco
 Il re del circo (1941) - Carasso, il domatore
 Il signore a doppio petto (1941)
 La compagnia della teppa (1941) - Il barone Duvert, capo della polizia
 Beatrice Cenci (1941) - Il capitano dei gendarmi
 The Hero of Venice (1941) - Mastro Zaccaria
 Villa da vendere (1941) - Pedro "Carlomagno" Laroca
 The Betrothed (1941) - Il primo bravo (uncredited)
 La leggenda della primavera (1941) - Il messaggero
 Capitan Tempesta (1942) - Methiub
 Girl of the Golden West (1942) - Butler's employee
 Giarabub (1942) - L'ufficiale al telefono in trincea
 Bengasi (1942) - Il capitano Marchi
 Don Juan (1942)
 Don Cesare di Bazan (1942) - Il "Corvo", il messagero del visconte
 Forbidden Music (1942) - Il marchese Melzi
 I due Foscari (1942) - Vivarin
 Pazzo d'amore (1942) - Tom
 L'usuraio (1943)
 Spie fra le eliche (1943) - Pablo
 Tempesta sul golfo (1943) - Giudice del tribunale militare
 La valle del diavolo (1943)
 Special Correspondents (1943) - L'ufficiale di Stato Maggiore in Africa
 Mist on the Sea (1944) - Lopez, il creditore
 Before Him All Rome Trembled (1946) - Police Officer
 La monaca di Monza (1947)
 Anthony of Padua (1949) - Capitano delle guardie di Ezzelina
 Toto the Sheik (1950) - Un beduino
 Alina (1950, writer)
 Messalina (1951) - (uncredited)
 Little World of Don Camillo (1952) - Il Bigio
 Red Shirts (1952) - Bonnert
 La Colpa di una madre (1952, director)
 Puccini (1953) - Boito
 The Island Monster (1954) - Foster
 Concert of Intrigue (1954) - Counter-espionage agent
 The Two Orphans (1954)
 Il padrone sono me (1955) - Minor Role (uncredited)
 Don Camillo's Last Round (1955) - Bigio
 Wives and Obscurities (1956) - Minor Role (uncredited)

References

External links

1898 births
1956 deaths
Italian male film actors
Italian male silent film actors
People from Udine
20th-century Italian male actors